Hutten is an originally German family name.

 Christoph Franz von Hutten (1673–1729), Bishop of  Würzburg
 Lars Hutten (born 1990), Dutch soccer player
 Philipp von Hutten (1505–1546), conquistador
 Ulrich von Hutten (1488–1523), German humanist

See also
 Hütten (disambiguation)